Ramprasad Premshankar Bakshi (27 June 1894 – 22 March 1989) was a Gujarati writer, scholar, translator and editor from India. He was a student of Anandshankar Dhruv and Narsinhrao Divetia, and was appointed the president of Gujarati Sahitya Parishad during 1976–77.

Life
Ramprasad Bakshi was born on 27 June 1894 in Junagadh. His family was native of Morbi. He completed his schooling from Rajkot, Wadhwan and matriculated in 1910. He graduated in 1914 from Gujarat College, Ahmedabad, with Sanskrit, and moved to Mumbai in 1915. He started his career as a teacher at Anandilal Poddar High School and retired from there from the post of its principal. He also served as the professor of Gujarati at Mithibai College, Mumbai for several years. He was the president of the 28th session (1976–1977) of the Gujarati Sahitya Parishad.

He died on 22 March 1989 at Mumbai.

Works
Ramprasad Bakshi was a student of Anandshankar Dhruv and Narsinhrao Divetia. He studied profoundly both Sanskrit and English literature, and is regarded as the representative of the period known in the history of Gujarati literature as 'Panditayuga'.

His works Natyarasa (1959) and Karunarasa (1963) are based on Indian dramatic theories. In Natyarasa, he explained the process of Rasa nishpatti and other elements of Indian dramatics. Karunarasa deals with the Greek concept of tragedy and the idea of Karunarasa discussed by Indian theoreticians. His Vangamaya Vimarsha (1963) is a collection of articles of literary criticism, in which, he included articles about Sanskrit and Western poetics, analytical studies about literary terms and concepts and reviews of some literary works, movements and forms. His work Govardhanramnum Manorajya (1976) focus on the life, works and philosophy of Gujarati author Govardhanram Tripathi.

Being a student of Narsinhrao Divetia, he translated Narsinhrao's Wilson Philological Lectures entitled Gujarati Language and Literature (Vol. I and II) into Gujarati as Gujarati Bhasha ane Sahitya (Vol. I and II, 1936-1957). He also edited Narsinhrao's diary, known as Rojanishi, in collaboration with Dhansukhlal Mehta. His other significant works include Kathasarita (1977) based on Kathasaritsagara and Gujarati translation of Sukhamani (1935), a Sikh religious book.

Awards
He received Narmad Suvarna Chandrak (1960-1964) for his work Vangamaya Vimarsha.

See also
 List of Gujarati-language writers

References

External links
 
 

Writers from Gujarat
Gujarati-language writers
1894 births
1989 deaths
People from Junagadh district
Indian literary critics
Scholars from Gujarat
20th-century Indian male writers
Translators to Gujarati
20th-century translators